Paengseong-eup is a town situated in PyeongtaekAcitynseongcheon basin in Gyeonggi Province in South Korea. The town hall is located in Gaeksari. Until 1914, the area including Godeok-myeon was partially in South Chungcheong Province County.

References

Gyeonggi Province